Claude Ferragne (born 14 October 1952) is a Canadian former high jumper who competed in the 1976 Summer Olympics. Ferragne was born in Montreal, Quebec.

References

1952 births
Living people
Athletes from Montreal
French Quebecers
Canadian male high jumpers
Olympic track and field athletes of Canada
Athletes (track and field) at the 1976 Summer Olympics
Commonwealth Games medallists in athletics
Athletes (track and field) at the 1974 British Commonwealth Games
Athletes (track and field) at the 1978 Commonwealth Games
Commonwealth Games gold medallists for Canada
Commonwealth Games bronze medallists for Canada
Medallists at the 1974 British Commonwealth Games
Medallists at the 1978 Commonwealth Games